9.11 is the fourth studio album by American recording artist Ron "Bumblefoot" Thal, released in November 2001. This is his second release under the Bumblefoot name. The CD title was originally to be called "Guitars Suck", but after the September 11 attacks, Thal decided to make it a non-profit fundraising CD and changed the name to 9.11. All proceeds go to the disaster relief humanitarian organization The American Red Cross.

Track listing

Personnel
Ron "Bumblefoot" Thal – guitars, bass guitar, drums, vocals
Lafrae Olivia Sci – drums on tracks 5, 6, 7, and 10
Mattias Eklundh – guitar solo at 2:45 on "Don Pardo Pimpwagon"
Jen Bruce – cello on "Legend of Van Cleef"
Madeline Caspari – cello on "Time"
Joboj – harassing phone call on "Guitars SUCK"
Dweezil Zappa – guitar solo at 2:00 on "Top of the World"

References

External links 
 The Official Bumblefoot Website
 Bald Freak Music Official Website

2001 albums
Ron "Bumblefoot" Thal albums